This is a list in alphabetical order of Hong Kong cricketers who have played first-class cricket. From 1841 to 1997, Hong Kong was a British colony, with many players who were born there going onto play county cricket in England. The Hong Kong cricket team first played first-class in the 2005 ICC Intercontinental Cup against the United Arab Emirates. Following a gap of ten years, Hong Kong returned to first-class in 2015 and have played a total of nine first-class matches, up until the discontinuation of the Intercontinental Cup in 2017. The last Hong Kong cricketer to play first-class cricket is Mark Chapman, who played for played in New Zealand for Auckland in March 2021.

The details are the player's usual name followed by the years in which he was active as a first-class player and then his name is given as it would appear on modern match scorecards. Note that many players represented other first-class teams besides Hong Kong. Players are shown to the end of the 2021–22 season.

A
 Tanwir Afzal (2015–2016–17) : T. Afzal
 Irfan Ahmed (2005–2015) : I. Ahmed
 Nadeem Ahmed (2005–2017–18) : N. Ahmed
 Tanveer Ahmed (2016–2017–18) : T. Ahmed
 Skhawat Ali (2015) : S. Ali
 Haseeb Amjad (2015–2015–16) : H. Amjad
 Haroon Arshad (2017–18) : H. A. Mohammad
 Jamie Atkinson (2009–2015–16) : J. J. Atkinson

B
 Waqas Barkat (2015–2017–18) : W. Barkat
 David Brettell (1975–78) : D. N. Brettell

C
 Ryan Campbell (1995/96–2005–06) : R. J. Campbell
 Christopher Carter (2015/16–2017–18) : C. J. Carter
 Mark Chapman (2015/16–2020–21) : M. S. Chapman
 Manoj Cheruparambil (2005) : M. Cheruparambil
 Kyle Christie (2017–18) : C. M. Christie

D
 Tabarak Dar (2005) : T. H. Dar

E
 Mark Eames (2005) : M. I. N. Eames

G
 Adam Gunthorpe (2005) : A. G. Gunthorpe
 Ilyas Gul (2005) : M. I. Gul

H
 Afzaal Haider (1991/92–2005) : M. A. Haider
 Nasir Hameed (2005) : N. Hameed
 Babar Hayat (2015–2017–18) : B. Hayat

I
 Jawaid Iqbal (2005) : J. Iqbal

K
 Aizaz Khan (2015/16–2017–18) : M. A. Khan
 Ehsan Khan (2016–2017–18) : E. Khan
 Khalid Khan (2005) : K. Khan
 Nizakat Khan (2015–2017–8) : N. Khan
 Waqas Khan (2016–2017–18) : W. Khan

L
 Roy Lamsam (2015) : J. P. R. Lamsam

M
 Cameron McAuslan (2017–18) : C. L. McAuslan
 Simon Myles (1987–1994) : S. D. Myles

N
 Ehsan Nawaz (2015–2017–18) : E. Nawaz

O
 Jonathan Orders (1978–1981) : J. O. D. Orders

P
 Robert Palmer (1981–1983) : R. W. M. Palmer
 Sean Parry (2006) : S. J. P. Parry
 Alec Pearce (1930–1946) : T. A. Pearce

R
 Anshuman Rath (2015/16–2017–18) : A. Rath
 Dermot Reeve (1983–1996) : D. A. Reeve
 Charles Rowe (1974–1984) : C. J. C. Rowe

S
 Alex Scott (2010–2012) : A. J. D. Scott
 Kinchit Shah (2015–16) : K. D. Shah
 Ninad Shah (2016) : N. D. Shah
 Rahul Sharma (1986/87–2005) : R. Sharma
 Tim Smart (2005) : T. T. Smart
 Matt Stiller (2016/17–2017–18) : M. Stiller

References

Cricket in Hong Kong
H